Burniston is a surname. Notable people with the surname include:

Christabel Burniston (1909–2006), English educator
Gordon Burniston (1885–?), English footballer
John Burniston, Deputy Governor of Bombay